Roberts Army Heliport  is a U.S. Army heliport at Camp Roberts in extreme southern Monterey County, California, United States. It is located just off U.S. Route 101, four nautical miles (7 km) northwest of the central business district of San Miguel, about halfway between it and the tiny community of Bradley in southern Monterey County. Roberts AHP has one helipad designated H1 with a 2,740 x 100 ft (835 x 30 m) asphalt surface.

References

External links 

Airports in Monterey County, California
Military heliports in the United States
Installations of the United States Army in California
United States Army airfields